Gone Glimmering is the debut studio album of American indie rock band Chavez. It was released on Matador Records on May 23, 1995. According to the liner notes, the album was recorded over weekends in December '94 and January '95 at various locations with various producers/engineers (Bob Weston, Bryce Goggin and John Agnello).

A music video was released for the track "Break Up Your Band" and was featured on MTV's Beavis and Butt-Head.

Critical reception
Billboard wrote that "no debut of late combines guts and gray matter quite as fluently as this New York quartet's killer blast of postnoise rock."

Track listing
"Nailed to the Blank Spot" - 2:07
"Break Up Your Band" - 2:56
"Laugh Track" - 3:58
"The Ghost by the Sea" - 4:01
"Pentagram Ring" - 2:26
"Peeled Out Too Late" - 3:36
"The Flaming Gong" - 1:53
"Wakeman's Air" - 4:23
"Relaxed Fit" - 4:39

Personnel

Chavez
The James Lo - drums
Scott Anthony Masciarelli - bass
Matt Sweeney - vocals, guitar
Clay Tarver - guitar

References

1995 debut albums
Chavez (band) albums